Reuben Cordell Davis (born May 7, 1965 in Greensboro, North Carolina) is a former American football defensive lineman in the National Football League. He was drafted by the Tampa Bay Buccaneers in the ninth round of the 1988 NFL Draft. He played college football at North Carolina and was a starting member of San Diego's 1994 Super Bowl team.

External links
Tampa Bay Buccaneers bio

1965 births
Living people
Players of American football from Greensboro, North Carolina
American football defensive tackles
North Carolina Tar Heels football players
Tampa Bay Buccaneers players
Phoenix Cardinals players
San Diego Chargers players
Grimsley High School alumni